Frances Separovic  (born  1954) is a biophysical chemist, Distinguished Professor Emeritus of Chemistry, Deputy Director of the Bio21 Institute and former Head of the School of Chemistry at the University of Melbourne, where she taught physical chemistry and graduate students in her field. She is credited with developing a technique which utilises nuclear magnetic resonance spectroscopy (NMR) to study peptides in aligned lipid bilayers, and has applications in the study of the structure of membrane proteins and their effects on the membrane. Her current research concerns 'the structure and interactions of amyloid peptides from Alzheimer's disease, pore-forming toxins and antibiotic peptides in model biological membranes'.

Early life 
Franica Šeparović was born in the Federal People's Republic of Yugoslavia, People's Republic of Croatia and emigrated to Australia with her family in 1957. They settled in Broken Hill, western New South Wales. Separovic excelled in school and she was awarded both a Commonwealth and teacher's scholarship; she began tertiary studies at the University of Sydney, but soon left to work at the Commonwealth Scientific and Industrial Research Organisation (CSIRO). In addition to work and study, Separovic was also a young mother.

Early career and academic achievements 
Separovic's career in science began as a Technical Assistant at a CSIRO microbiology lab (1972–78) 'counting colonies' and 'doing the washing up'. Adept at these basic tasks, she habitually finished her work early and went in search of more to do. Her capacity with mathematics recommended her to a section of the department involved in modelling lipid membranes, and trying to discover why they leak. This was the project upon which Separovic first encountered an NMR instrument – at the time (the 70s) a new technique – which now plays such a major role in her research. It was here, too, that she made her first contribution to a scientific paper: using her aptitude for mathematics to determine via 'simple geometry' the smallest possible radius of a vesicle which it is possible to make (10-nanometers), solving a contemporaneous argument within the scientific community.

In 1978 Separovic completed a Technical Certificate in Biology at Sydney Technical College, and continued to work at the CSIRO as a Technical Officer while studying part-time on a Bachelor of Arts at Macquarie University, with majors in Mathematics and Physics. She completed her undergraduate degree in 1984, at which time she became an Experimental Scientist at CSIRO; in 1986 she finished an Honours qualification in Physics (also at Macquarie University). Between 1986 and 1992, in addition to being a single parent and working full-time at the CSIRO, she completed a PhD (part-time) in Physics at the University of New South Wales. Following a post-doctoral fellowship at the National Institutes of Health (Bethesda, USA), Frances returned briefly to CSIRO before moving to the University of Melbourne as an Associate Professor & Reader in 1996.

Later career and public recognition 
In 2005, Separovic became the first woman to be appointed to a professorship in chemistry in Victoria. She is currently Professor of Chemistry and Group Leader at the Bio21 Institute, Past-President of the Biophysical Society and Foreign Secretary of the Australian Academy of Science and was Head of School at the University of Melbourne (2010–2016), President of the Australian & New Zealand Magnetic Society for Resonance (ANZMAG), Treasurer of the Royal Australian Chemical Institute, President of the Australian Society for Biophysics, and chaired the board of the Centre for Chemistry and Biotechnology at Deakin University. She has been on the editorial board of Biochimica et Biophysica Acta, an editor of European Biophysics Journal and a member of the editorial advisory board of Accounts of Chemical Research and Chemical Reviews.

In 2012 Frances Separovic was made Fellow of the International Society for Magnetic Resonance (ISMAR), the Biophysical Society (USA) and the Australian Academy of Science – the first woman to be elected to the AAS in the field of chemistry. At the time, Separovic had published over 130 papers and successfully organized more than 25 conferences, which she has since doubled.  In 2017 Frances was one of twelve IUPAC Distinguished Women in Chemistry/Chemical Engineering awardees and received a University of New South Wales Alumni Award for Science & Technology and in 2019 received the Royal Australian Chemical Institute Margaret Sheil Leadership Award.

In March 2018 Separovic was inducted into the Victorian Honour Roll of Women and became Redmond Barry Distinguished Professor Emeritus in February 2019. Frances was appointed an Officer of the Order of Australia (AO) in the 2019 Queen's Birthday Honours for her "distinguished service to science education, particularly to biophysical chemistry, as an academic, and to young women scientists".

References 

Living people
Women biochemists
Australian women chemists
Australian biochemists
Australian biophysicists
Croatian scientists
Croatian biochemists
Croatian emigrants to Australia
Fellows of the Australian Academy of Science
Macquarie University alumni
University of New South Wales alumni
University of Melbourne women
Year of birth missing (living people)
Officers of the Order of Australia